Anıl Ulaş Övençoğlu is a Turkish businessman.

He is also the founder of Realtor Gayrimenkul A.Ş, which sells Turkey's largest volume of real estate

Business life
Anıl Ulaş Övençoğlu, the Founder and chairman of the Board of Realtor Global, which has
received investment and sales support from 40 countries, mainly in the Middle East,

Awards 
- He received Turkey's Leading Brand Awards / Successful Real Estate Investment Brand of the Year

References 

Living people
Turkish businesspeople
Turkish chief executives